Murray R. Ursulak is a Canadian curler,  and .

Teams

Personal life
His son Richard Ursulak was drafted 280 overall in the 2006 WHL Bantam draft by the Tri-City Americans.

References

External links
 
 Murray Ursulak – Curling Canada Stats Archive

Living people
Brier champions
Canadian male curlers
Curlers from Edmonton
Year of birth missing (living people)